Jesús Conde (born 4 July 1949) is a Mexican weightlifter. He competed in the men's bantamweight event at the 1972 Summer Olympics.

References

1949 births
Living people
Mexican male weightlifters
Olympic weightlifters of Mexico
Weightlifters at the 1972 Summer Olympics
Place of birth missing (living people)
Pan American Games medalists in weightlifting
Pan American Games bronze medalists for Mexico
Weightlifters at the 1971 Pan American Games
20th-century Mexican people
21st-century Mexican people